Ethiopia participated in the 2010 Summer Youth Olympics in Singapore.

Medalists

Athletics

Boys
Track and Road Events

Girls
Track and Road Events

Swimming

References

External links
Competitors List: Ethiopia

2010 in Ethiopian sport
Nations at the 2010 Summer Youth Olympics
Ethiopia at the Youth Olympics